Paulo Roberto Marques Roris (born 12 August 1967) is a former Brazilian born, Spanish futsal player, best known for his spell with ElPozo Murcia as a Pivot.

Career

Roberto was nicknamed "Maravilla".

References

uefa.com

External links
FutsalPlanet profile

1967 births
Living people
Brazilian emigrants to Spain
Spanish men's futsal players
Brazilian men's futsal players
ElPozo Murcia FS players
Footballers from Rio de Janeiro (city)